Jardines de la Reina is an archipelago in the southern part of Cuba, in the provinces of Camagüey and Ciego de Ávila.

It was named by Christopher Columbus to honour the Queen of Spain, Isabella I of Castile. Since 1996 a marine reserve was established covering a large swath of the archipelago. In 2010, Jardines de la Reina was established as a national park.

Geography
It is located in the Caribbean Sea, between the Gulf of Ana Maria (north-west), Gulf of Guacanayabo (south) and Caballones Channel (west). Cuba's second largest archipelago (smaller only than Jardines del Rey), it is formed by more than 600 cays and islands. Other cays in the archipelago include Caguamas, Cayos Cinco Balas, Cayo Anclitas, Cayo Algodon Grande, Cayos Pingues and Cayo Granada. Part of the archipelago is also known as Laberinto de las Doce Leguas (The Labyrinth of the Twelve Leagues)

Table of Islands

1) The Islands area and population data retrieved from the 2012 census.

Fishing
The archipelago is a popular destination for diving and sport fly-fishing. Only catch and release fly-fishing and a limited, well-regulated lobster fishery is allowed in the park, although many other fisheries occur surrounding the park and close to cays out of the park limits. It used to be one of Fidel Castro's favorite fishing spots. Species of fish found here include Cubera snapper, Bonefish, Yellowfin grouper, Black grouper, Atlantic goliath grouper as well as Strombus gigas (the large Caribbean conch) and Whale shark.
Besides being an extraordinary site for fly fishing, one its main attractions for diving is the abundance of reef sharks.

Diving 
Jardines de la Reina (The Gardens of the Queen) is one of the most popular scuba destinations of Cuba. The underwater landscapes include canyons, pinnacles and caves. Healthy mangroves, sponges and black corals cover the reef. The Jardines de la Reina also host numerous silky and Caribbean reef sharks. In the mangroves labyrinth it’s possible to find crocodiles and snorkel with them.

See also
Geography of Cuba
Jardines del Rey

References

External links
60 Minutes segment on the reefs
Doce Leguas Labyrinth: a Community Offshore

Islands of Cuba
National parks of Cuba
Geography of Camagüey Province
Geography of Ciego de Ávila Province
Tourist attractions in Camagüey Province
Tourist attractions in Ciego de Ávila Province